Maddison Smith (born 17 March 2000) is a field hockey player from Australia.

Personal life
Maddison Smith was born and raised in Albion Park, New South Wales.

Career

Domestic league
In Hockey Australia's domestic league, the Sultana Bran Hockey One, Smith captains the NSW Pride.

Under–18
Smith made her junior international debut in 2018 during a qualification tournament for the Youth Olympic Games in Port Moresby. She followed this up with an appearance at the Youth Olympics in Buenos Aires.

Hockeyroos
In 2023, Smith made her Hockeyroos debut during season three of the FIH Pro League. She was later named in the National Development Squad.

References

External links

2000 births
Living people
Australian female field hockey players
Female field hockey defenders
Field hockey people from New South Wales